Kay Bailey Hutchison (born 1943) was a U.S. Senator from Texas from 1993 to 2013. Senator Hutchison may also refer to:

Charles W. Hutchison (1865–1945), Wisconsin State Senate
Mark Hutchison (born 1963), Nevada State Senate

See also
Senator Hutchinson (disambiguation)
Joseph Collier Hutcheson (1906–1972), Virginia State Senate